The Local Electoral Act 2001 is an Act of the New Zealand Parliament that provides for the regulation of local body elections in New Zealand, which entails provisions relating to the timing of local elections and other forms of rules surrounding electoral processes, Māori wards and constituencies, and which voting system the local government uses in elections. It was established following the 2001 Review of the former Local Elections and Polls Act 1976 by the Department of Internal Affairs which was charged with reviewing and rewriting the Act governing local elections.

On 20 October 2022, the draft report of the Future for Local Government Review recommended that the voting age for local elections be lowered to 16 and extend local government terms from 3 years to 4 years.

On 21 November 2022, the Supreme Court of New Zealand ruled in Make It 16 Incorporated v Attorney-General that the voting age of 18 years was inconsistent with the right to be free from discrimination under section 19 of the Bill of Rights Act 1990 and that they had not been justified. The day after, Prime Minister Jacinda Ardern and Deputy Prime Minister Grant Robertson confirmed that the Labour Party ministers were considering whether to amend the Local Electoral Act to allow 16-year-olds to vote in local body elections.

Māori wards and constituencies 

The Local Electoral Act 2001 allows territorial authorities to vote to establish Māori wards and regional councils to establish Māori constituencies of which only those of Māori descent and on the Māori electoral roll are eligible to vote in. These constituencies are similar to the Māori electorates established under the Electoral Act 1993, but on a local government level.

In August 2020, the Tauranga City Council resolved to establish a Māori ward, later on 28 January 2021, it was confirmed by local electoral officer Warwick Lampp that a petition calling for a local referendum to overturn the council's decision to establish a Māori ward had reached the necessary threshold of 5% of eligible local voters. Between 2002–2021, 24 different councils attempted to establish Māori wards, however, only 2 of the 24 councils were ever successful.

On 1 February 2021, Minister of Local Government Nanaia Mahuta announced that the Sixth Labour Government would be introducing a bill to remove the mechanism where 5% of local voters can by petition, call a local referendum to overturn a council's decision to establish Māori wards. Mahuta commented that "Polls have proven to be an almost insurmountable barrier to councils trying to improve the democratic representation of Māori interests. This process is fundamentally unfair to Māori."

At the first reading of the bill, former National Party MP Simon Bridges said that he found it personally insulting as a Māori man because "it says I'm not good enough because of my whakapapa, because of the colour of my skin ... this bill to me says I'm not good enough to win a vote of a non-Māori, well I am good enough".

On 24 February 2021, the bill passed its third reading and was granted Royal assent on 1 March 2021 and enacted as the Local Electoral (Māori Wards and Māori Constituencies) Amendment Act 2021. The National Party said that it intends to repeal the bill if elected in 2023.

See also 

 Local elections in New Zealand
 Local government in New Zealand
 Voting in New Zealand

References 

2001 in New Zealand law
Statutes of New Zealand